Solar Ship Inc.  is a company based out of Toronto, Ontario, Canada working to develop a hybrid aircraft to deliver critical cargo to cut-off places.  The solarship gains lift from both buoyant gas and aerodynamics, and uses power from solar panels. The aircraft is a new concept of transport that does not rely on fossil fuels or ground infrastructure.

History
The concept behind Solar Ship was based on airships and the Canadian bush plane, and was devised by Jay Godsall in 1983. In 2006, Solar Ship Inc. was officially established.

Aircraft

The solarship's wing-ship design allows for extreme short takeoff and landing (XSTOL or eSTOL), such as in a soccer field. Its design provides a large surface area for solar electric power, allowing long, self- sufficient range. Solarships can also be powered by traditional combustion when solar energy is unavailable. However, the goal is to develop a new mode of transportation that does not depend on fossil fuels, roads, or runways. The solarship can access areas where planes, trucks, ships, and airships cannot, delivering cargo to the places that are currently cut off from the benefits of the connected world. Each solar plane is designed and built to the requirements of a mission. Currently, there are three initial missions with specific requirements: the Wolverine, the Caracal, and the Nanuq. Solar Ship's active mission, as of December 2015, is Mission Burundi.

Incidents
On August 29, 2014, a prototype aircraft owned, designed, and operated by Solar Ship crashed during a test flight in a tobacco field near Brantford Airport, seriously injuring its two pilots, Mark Taylor and Mark Marshall. One of the pilots had to be cut out of the aircraft by rescuers. The incident resulted in the temporary closure of Brantford Airport.

See also
 Solar Splash

References

External links

Manufacturing companies based in Toronto
Aircraft manufacturers of Canada
Solar power
Electric boats